Antoine Gillet (born 22 March 1988, Libramont-Chevigny) is a Belgian sprint athlete.  He was part of Belgium's 4 x 400 m relay team at the 2012 Summer Olympics.

Achievements

See also
 Belgian men's 4 × 400 metres relay team

References

External links
 

1988 births
Living people
Belgian male sprinters
Athletes (track and field) at the 2012 Summer Olympics
Olympic athletes of Belgium
European Athletics Championships medalists
Sportspeople from Luxembourg (Belgium)
World Athletics Championships athletes for Belgium
People from Libramont-Chevigny
World Athletics Indoor Championships medalists